The Sukhothai Bangkok (Thai: โรงแรม สุโขทัย กรุงเทพ) is a hotel in Bangkok, located in the city's Sathorn neighbourhood. The hotel opened in 1991, and is managed by Sukhothai Hotels and Resorts.

History 
The historic town of Sukhothai which means “The Dawn of Happiness” - and its surrounding region are known as a UNESCO World Heritage site. The Sukhothai hotel was opened in 1991 as the Beaufort Sukhothai hotel, then managed by the Beaufort group of hotels and was part of The Leading Hotels of the World marketing alliance. The hotel lies on six acres of land in Bangkok's Sathorn neighbourhood. It was developed by the Hong Kong-based real estate developer, HKR International with the help of Indonesian-hotelier, Adrian Zecha. The hotel was designed in a style inspired by the ancient Sukhothai Kingdom by the late Australian-architect, Kerry Hill alongside his American counterpart, Ed Tuttle. The hotel was one of Hill's first major projects, and also marked the only instance in which he collaborated with Tuttle. 

In 2020, the hotel joined Small Luxury Hotels of the World as a partner hotel.

Awards 

 Tourism Authority of Thailand: 2015 The Best of Thailand Awards Voted by Chinese Tourists – Top 10 Best Luxury Hotel
 Forbes Travel Guide: 4 Star Rated Hotels 2016-2018
 Conde Nast Travel Magazine Readers' Choice Awards: 2009 - Top 100 Asia Hotels, 2010 – Top 125 Hotels in Asia, 2011 Gold list, 2011 Top 20 Overseas Business Hotels, 2013 - Top 15 Hotels in Thailand, 2015 & 2017 - Top 10 Hotels in Bangkok
 SmartTravelAsia.com: Best in Travel 2013 - No.10 in Best Leisure Hotel / Resort in Asia, Best in Travel 2014 - No.15 in Best Leisure Hotel / Resort in Asia, 2009 Top 25 List – Business Hotels; Top 25 List – Leisure Hotels
 The Daily Telegraph: 2011 – The 50 Best Hotels in the World

Gallery

Reference 

Hotels in Bangkok
Hotels established in 1991
Hotel buildings completed in 1991
HKR International